Horace Clark may refer to:

Horace Clark (assemblyman), New York state assemblyman
Horace F. Clark (1815–1873), U.S. Representative and railroad executive
Horace Clark (cricketer) (1889–1967), English cricketer
Horace Clarke (1939–2020), American baseball player